This was the first edition of the tournament. 

Daniel Nestor and Édouard Roger-Vasselin won the title, defeating Pierre-Hugues Herbert and Nicolas Mahut in the final, 6–4, 6–4.

Seeds

Draw

Draw

References
 Main Draw

Euoprean Open
European Open (tennis)